Puliyur may refer to:

 Puliyur, Karur, a town in Karur district in Tamil Nadu, India
 Puliyur, Nagapattinam, a village in Nagapattinam district in Tamil Nadu, India
 Puliyoor, a village in Alappuzha district in Kerala, India
 Puliyur, Sivagangai district; located near Madurai in Tamil Nadu